The Toltec Lodge, at 228 High St. in Prescott, Arizona, was built in 1919.  It was listed on the National Register of Historic Places in 2000.

It is a one-story Craftsman / Prairie School style house built for Le Roy and Margherite Anderson.

References

National Register of Historic Places in Prescott, Arizona
Prairie School architecture
American Craftsman architecture in Arizona
Buildings and structures completed in 1919